Tərlan may refer to:

Tarlan Ahmadov (b. 1971), Azerbaijani footballer.
Tarlan Karimov (b. 1986), Azerbaijani judoka.

See also
Tarlan (disambiguation)